Anna Savelyeva (born 29 July 1977) is a Russian speed skater. She competed in the women's 1000 metres at the 1998 Winter Olympics.

References

External links
 

1977 births
Living people
Russian female speed skaters
Olympic speed skaters of Russia
Speed skaters at the 1998 Winter Olympics
Speed skaters from Moscow